The 2020 UK Championship (also known as the 2020 Betway UK Championship for sponsorship reasons) was a professional snooker tournament, that took place from 23November to 6December 2020 at the Marshall Arena, in Milton Keynes, England. The event was the first Triple Crown and fifth ranking event of the 2020–21 snooker season. The tournament was played behind closed doors due to COVID-19 restrictions. The event was broadcast by the BBC and Eurosport and featured a prize fund of £1,009,000 with the winner receiving £200,000.

The defending champion was Ding Junhui, who defeated Stephen Maguire 10–6 in the 2019 final. However, Ding lost 5–6 to David Grace in the second round.

Both Kyren Wilson and Stuart Bingham made maximum breaks in the first round of the event. On 28November, Trump became the fourth player to make 750 career centuries, during his last-64 match against Dominic Dale. Later in the tournament, on 4December, Robertson also completed his 750th century break in his quarter-final defeat of Mark Selby.

Neil Robertson won the title beating Judd Trump 10–9 in the final. At 9–9 Trump missed a simple final pink when only needing the pink and black to win the title, Robertson then potted the pink to win his 3rd UK Championship.

Overview
The 2020 UK Championship took place between 23 November and 6 December 2020 at the Marshall Arena in Milton Keynes, England. It was the fifth ranking event of the 2020–21 snooker season, and the first of three Triple Crown events. There were 128 players from the World Snooker Tour taking part in the championship. All matches until the final were played over a maximum of 11 , with the final played as a best-of-19-frames match, held over two sessions. The first round of the competition started on 23 November, with players seeded according to their world rankings.

The defending champion was Ding Junhui, who defeated Stephen Maguire 10–6 in the 2019 final to win his third UK title. As defending champion, Ding was seeded first, with world champion Ronnie O'Sullivan seeded second.

Prize fund
The total prize fund for the event was £1,009,000 with the winner receiving £200,000. The breakdown of prize money is shown below:

 Winner: £200,000
 Runner-up: £80,000
 Semi-final: £40,000
 Quarter-final: £24,500
 Last 16: £17,000
 Last 32: £12,000
 Last 64: £6,500
 Highest break: £15,000
 Total: £1,009,000

Tournament draw
The results of the event are shown below. The winners of each match are indicated in bold.

Top half

Section 1

Section 2

Section 3

Section 4

Bottom half

Section 5

Section 6

Section 7

Section 8

Finals

Final

Century breaks
A total of 136 century breaks were made by 60 players during the tournament.
Neil Robertson scored 13 total centuries, setting a record for the UK Championship – the previous record of 12 centuries was shared by Stephen Hendry (1994) and Ronnie O'Sullivan (2003).

147, 140  Stuart Bingham
147, 132, 132, 107  Kyren Wilson
146, 101  Hossein Vafaei
141, 136, 125  Kurt Maflin
141, 135, 114, 104  Zhou Yuelong
141  Chen Zifan
140, 121, 117, 106  Mark Selby
140  Yuan Sijun
139, 136, 133, 109  Chang Bingyu
139, 106  Zhao Xintong
139  Shaun Murphy
138, 131, 111, 102, 100  Matthew Selt
138, 104  David Gilbert
137, 126  Graeme Dott
137, 121  Daniel Wells
137, 116  Igor Figueiredo
135, 135, 132, 130, 130, 125, 122, 118, 115, 110, 104, 103, 100  Neil Robertson
135, 133, 128, 122, 120, 103  Stephen Maguire
134, 134, 133, 126, 123, 105, 103  Lu Ning
134, 127, 100  Anthony McGill
134, 101, 100  Li Hang
133, 112, 103, 102  Robert Milkins
133, 100  Gerard Greene
132, 107, 100  Jack Lisowski
132  Mark Allen
132  Gary Wilson
131  Jamie Clarke
130  Ding Junhui
130  Andy Hicks
130  Yan Bingtao
128, 118  Si Jiahui
128, 113, 109, 109, 107, 106, 103, 102  Judd Trump
128  Stuart Carrington
125  Jordan Brown
124  Luo Honghao
123  John Higgins
122, 105, 105  Luca Brecel
122  Barry Hawkins
121, 104  Xiao Guodong
121  Ronnie O'Sullivan
120  Chris Wakelin
119, 106  Mark Williams
118, 111, 105  Elliot Slessor
116, 116, 105  Jimmy Robertson
112  Liam Highfield
109  Jak Jones
108  Joe Perry
107  Sean Maddocks
106, 105  Lyu Haotian
105  Alexander Ursenbacher
104  Ali Carter
103, 102  Pang Junxu
102  Dominic Dale
101  Aaron Hill
101  Allan Taylor
100  Andrew Higginson
100  Simon Lichtenberg
100  Martin O'Donnell
100  Barry Pinches
100  Xu Si

References

2020
UK Championship
UK Championship
UK Championship
UK Championship
Sport in Milton Keynes